Lynne Williams is an American lawyer and politician from Maine. A Democrat from Bar Harbor, Williams represents District 135 in the Maine House of Representatives.

In 2010, Williams sought the Maine Green Independent Party nomination for Governor. However, she was unable to gather enough signatures to make the ballot nor to qualify for public financing. Instead, Williams was the Green Independent nominee for State Senate, which she lost to Brian Langley.

Education
She earned a bachelor's degree in psychology from Merrimack College in 1972, an M.A. in experimental psychology from City University of New York in 1975, a Ph.D. in social psychology from the University of Southern California in 1981, and a J.D. from Golden Gate University School of Law in 1998.

References

1950 births
Living people
Merrimack College alumni
City University of New York alumni
University of Southern California alumni
Golden Gate University School of Law alumni
Maine Greens
Maine lawyers
People from Bar Harbor, Maine
Democratic Party members of the Maine House of Representatives
Women state legislators in Maine
21st-century American women politicians
21st-century American politicians